Nicolás Gabriel Quiroga (born 20 May 1995) is an Argentine professional footballer who plays as a midfielder for Sportivo Desamparados.

Career
Quiroga played for Amigos del Barrio Perlé at a young age, prior to moving to Independiente Rivadavia in 2000. After fifteen years in their youth system, he was subsequently moved to the senior squad in 2015 and selected as an unused substitute twice for matches with Boca Unidos and Douglas Haig. Quiroga's professional debut came on 14 April 2017 in a draw with Almagro. After four league appearances in four seasons as a substitute, his first start arrived against Los Andes in the club's 2018–19 opener.

Career statistics
.

References

External links

1995 births
Living people
Sportspeople from Mendoza Province
Argentine footballers
Association football midfielders
Primera Nacional players
Independiente Rivadavia footballers
Sarmiento de Resistencia footballers
Sportivo Desamparados footballers